The Real Insurance Sydney Harbour 10k is an Australian 10 km road race, held annually in Sydney, Australia. The event is certified accurate and is approved by the Association of International Marathons and Distance Races (AIMS).

The Real Insurance Sydney Harbour 10k has been running since 2012 and can be used as a test event before the winter classics.
The Real Insurance Sydney Harbour 10k also has an additional 5k course which will be running for the first time in 2014.

Course route 
The event starts and finishes in the historic area of The Rocks with the course hugging Sydney Harbour around Barangaroo and Darling Harbour.
Features en route include the Overseas Passenger Terminal, the Opera House, the Harbour Bridge, Cockle Bay, Tumbalong Park and Pyrmont Bay.

Winners 10km 

 Fastest time ran in Australia in 2012

Winners 5km

See also
City2Surf (Sydney)

References

External links 
 Official site

Athletics competitions in Australia
2012 establishments in Australia
Recurring sporting events established in 2012
Sports competitions in Sydney